Thiron-Gardais is a commune in the Eure-et-Loir department in northern France. The Tiron Abbey is located in the commune.

Population

See also
Tironensian Order
Communes of the Eure-et-Loir department

References

Communes of Eure-et-Loir